The International Skating Union has organised the World Allround Speed Skating Championships for Women since 1936. Unofficial championships were held in the years 1933–1935.

History

Distances used
 In the years 1933–1935, three distances were skated: 500 m, 1000 m and 1500 m.
 In the years 1936–1955, four distances were skated: 500 m, 1000 m, 3000 m and 5000 m (the old combination).
 In the years 1956–1982, four distances were skated: 500 m, 1000 m, 1500 m and 3000 m (the mini combination).
 Since 1983, four distances are skated: 500 m, 1500 m, 3000 m and 5000 m (the small combination).

Ranking systems used
 Since 1933, the samalog system has been in use.

Records
 Gunda Niemann-Stirnemann (nee Kleemann) of East Germany won a total of 8 world championship titles, three consecutive in 1991–1993, and another five consecutive titles in 1995–1999.
 Ireen Wüst has a record 13 medals, 12 of each which were won in consecutive championships (2007–2018) – seven golds (2007, 2011–2014, 2017, 2020), four silvers (2008, 2015, 2016, 2018) and two bronzes (2009, 2010). Previously, this record belonged to Claudia Pechstein of Germany – 11 medals in consecutive championships (1996–2006) with one gold (2000), eight silvers (1996–1999, 2001, 2003, 2004, 2006) and two bronzes (2002, 2005).

Medal winners

Unofficial championships

Official championships

All-time medal count

Unofficial World Championships of 1933–1935 (not recognized by the ISU) included

Multiple medalists
Boldface denotes active skaters and highest medal count among all skaters (including those not included in these tables) per type.

* including one medal won at the unofficial championship of 1935.

See also
 World Allround Speed Skating Championships for Men

Notes

References

Allround
All-round speed skating
Recurring sporting events established in 1936